"Start Over Georgia" is a song co-written and recorded by American country music artist Collin Raye.  It was released in July 1999 as the fourth single from the album The Walls Came Down.  The song reached #39 on the Billboard Hot Country Singles & Tracks chart.  The song was written by Raye and his brother, Scott Wray.

Chart performance

References

1999 singles
1998 songs
Collin Raye songs
Song recordings produced by Billy Joe Walker Jr.
Song recordings produced by Paul Worley
Epic Records singles
Songs about Georgia (U.S. state)